The Journal may refer to:

Newspapers 
 The Journal (Adelaide), a newspaper published in South Australia
 The Journal (Newcastle upon Tyne newspaper), a daily newspaper produced in Newcastle upon Tyne, England, United Kingdom
 The Journal (New Ulm), a daily newspaper in New Ulm, Minnesota, United States
 The Journal (student newspaper), a fortnightly, citywide student newspaper in Edinburgh, Scotland, United Kingdom
 The Journal (West Virginia newspaper), a daily newspaper produced in Martinsburg, West Virginia, United States
 "The Journal", a nickname for The Wall Street Journal
 The Journal, a weekly newspaper published in El Cerrito, California by the East Bay Times
 TheJournal.ie, an online newspaper in Ireland
 The Queen's Journal, or simply The Journal, the student newspaper published at Queen's University, Ontario, Canada

Television 
 The Journal (Canadian TV program), a Canadian current affairs TV program broadcast from 1982 to 1992
 "The Journal" (Hey Arnold!), an episode of the animated television series Hey Arnold!
 The Journal (TV news), the hourly English version of the international news program Journal, available in multiple languages by Deutsche Welle

Other 
The Journal (thejournalmag.org), a literary journal published by Ohio State University
the Journal, a short-lived (2 issues, 1999–2000) poetry magazine by Billy Mills and Catherine Walsh

See also
 Journal (disambiguation)
 Journal News (disambiguation)